The Shire of Gatton was a local government area located in the Lockyer Valley region between the cities of Toowoomba and Ipswich, and about  west of Brisbane, the state capital of Queensland, Australia.

History

Tarampa Division was created on 15 January 1880 under the Divisional Boards Act 1879, and its board held its first meeting on 20 February 1880. On 25 April 1888, the Laidley Division area broke away and separately incorporated, and on 25 January 1890, the Forest Hill area moved from Tarampa Division to Laidley Division.

With the passage of the Local Authorities Act 1902, Tarampa Division became the Shire of Tarampa on 31 March 1903.

On 3 September 1938, the Shire of Tarampa was renamed the Shire of Gatton. On 19 March 1949 it grew to incorporate part of the former Shires of Drayton and Highfields, while losing some of its original area to the City of Toowoomba and Shire of Crows Nest.

On 15 March 2008, under the Local Government (Reform Implementation) Act 2007 passed by the Parliament of Queensland on 10 August 2007, the Shire of Gatton merged with the Shire of Laidley to form the Lockyer Valley Region.

Structure
The Shire of Gatton was divided into three divisions electing a total of eight councillors, plus a popularly elected mayor.

 Division One (4 councillors)—eastern area, including Gatton.
 Division Two (2 councillors)—central area, including Grantham and Helidon.
 Division Three (2 councillors)—western area, including Withcott.

Towns and localities
The Shire of Gatton included the following settlements:

 Gatton
 Blanchview
 Caffey
 Carpendale
 College View
 Flagstone Creek
 Fordsdale
 Grantham
 Helidon

 Ingoldsby
 Iredale
 Junction View
 Lake Clarendon
 Lawes
 Lower Tenthill
 Ma Ma Creek
 Mount Sylvia

 Mount Whitestone
 Murphys Creek
 Postmans Ridge
 Ropeley
 Thornton
 Upper Tenthill
 Withcott
 Woodlands

Population

Mayors
 Bernie Sutton (1993–2000)
 Ray Ferdinand (2000-2001)
 Jim McDonald (2002–2004)
 Steve Jones (2004–2008)

References

Further reading

External links
 University of Queensland: Queensland Places: Gatton Shire

Further reading
  (111 pages)

Gatton
1880 establishments in Australia
2008 disestablishments in Australia
Populated places disestablished in 2008